is a railway station on the Hokuriku Main Line  in the city of Echisen, Fukui Prefecture, Japan, operated by the West Japan Railway Company (JR West).

Lines

Station layout
The station consists of two opposed unnumbered ground-level side platforms connected by a level crossing. The station is unattended.

Platforms

Adjacent stations

History
Ōshio Station opened on 20 December 1927.  With the privatization of Japanese National Railways (JNR) on 1 April 1987, the station came under the control of JR West.

Passenger statistics
In fiscal 2016, the station was used by an average of 251 passengers daily (boarding passengers only).

Surrounding area
Takefu No.6 Middle School

See also
 List of railway stations in Japan

References

External links

  

Railway stations in Fukui Prefecture
Stations of West Japan Railway Company
Railway stations in Japan opened in 1927
Hokuriku Main Line
Echizen, Fukui